Nayyerabad or Nirabad may refer to:
 Nayyerabad, Hamadan
 Nayyerabad, Isfahan
 Nayyerabad, Razavi Khorasan